Wavvves is the second album by American band Wavves.

Track listing

References

2009 albums
Wavves albums
Fat Possum Records albums